Grigeo AB (formerly Grigiškės AB) - the only paper and wood industry company group in Lithuania, and one of the biggest in the Baltic states. The group comprises the following companies: Grigeo AB, Grigeo Packaging UAB, Grigeo Klaipėda AB, Grigeo Baltwood UAB, Grigeo Recycling UAB, Grigeo Recycling SIA, and Mena Pak AT. Grigeo AB is situated at 10 Vilniaus str, in Grigiškės, next to the A1 Vilnius-Kaunas-Klaipėda highway. 

800 employees work at the company group. Yearly turnover of Grigeo AB group is approximately €163 million. Grigeo AB is a member of Lithuanian Forest association, Grigeo Baltwood UAB - a member of European Panel Federation EPF, Grigeo Packaging UAB – a member of European Federation of Corrugated Board Manufacturers FEFCO. It is the first paper production company in Lithuania, which has been awarded with the IFS HPC Quality Certificate. The company is certified by Ecolabel, SWAN, FSC and other certificates

Grigiškės aqueduct - a protected technical monument - is preserved in the territory of the company.

History 
The Grigiškės paper factory was founded in 1923. Grigas Kurecas, a gifted mechanic, hydraulic engineer, and businessman, started building the factory on the confluence of Neris and Vokė. The factory started operating in 1925.

In 1936, the production of white cardboard, cardboard boxes, and wrapping paper started. Before the war started, 300 employees worked in the company. The factory was demolished and burned down on the 12th of July in 1944, when the German army was retreating. It took more than a year to rebuild the factory. From 1980 to 1985, Grigiškės factory was the biggest cellulose and paper production company in Lithuania and employed almost 3000 workers. Grigiškės paper mill also managed the Pabradė and Naujieji Verkiai factories.

Grigiškės AB was established in. 1991. In November of 2003, Grigiškės AB merged with Naujieji Verkiai AB. In order to carry out a project for the establishment of a new sawmill, Baltwood UAB was established, which is operating in Grigiškės. In 2010, Grigiškės AB acquired Klaipėdos Kartonas AB, which currently functions under the name Grigeo Klaipėda AB. The trademark Grigeo has been in use since 2015. In January of 2019, Grigeo AB transferred the production of corrugated cardboard to the subsidiary Grigeo Packaging UAB, which was founded in 2009.

Production 

Grigeo AB group produces tissue paper, container-board and honeycomb, corrugated cardboard and packaging, and fibreboards. The group manufactures its products under the principle of circular economy: the used paper and packaging is sent back into the production process.

Household products by Grigeo AB trademark Grite:

·       Toilet paper

·       Kitchen towels

·       Folded towels

·       Handkerchiefs 

·       Facial tissue

Business products by Grigeo AB Grite Proffesional:

·       Toilet paper

·       Paper towels

·       Wiping paper

·       Sanitary pads

·       Paper napkins

·       Dispensers

·       Liquid and foam soap

Management 

Alongside the parent company, Grigeo AB also owns following main subsidiaries:
Grigeo Klaipėda AB - the biggest cardboard production and paper packaging recycling company in the Baltic states.
Grigeo Packaging UAB - manufactures and exports corrugated cardboard, food and drink packaging, furniture packaging, and individual orders of packaging.
Grigeo Baltwood UAB - manufactures and exports fibreboards, painted and unpainted fibreboard furniture, and packaging.
Grigeo Recycling UAB - accumulates secondary raw materials and prepares them for production.
Mena Pak AT - manufacturer of corrugated cardboard in Ukraine
Grigeo AB stocks are part of the Nasdaq Vilnius AB Official Baltic State stock exchange list of securities (stock symbol - GRG1L).

Awards 

Grigeo AB has been recognised by markets in Lithuania, Latvia, Estonia, and Scandinavia. Grite products, manufactured by the company, has won Brand of The Year, held by the daily Verslo žinios together with the market research company Nielsen, and the Lithuanian Product of the Year Award.

In 2018, Grigeo AB was among the most advanced companies, quoted by Nasdaq stock exchanges in the Baltic states.

References

External links
 Official website

Companies listed on Nasdaq Vilnius
Manufacturing companies of the Soviet Union
Pulp and paper companies
Companies nationalised by the Soviet Union